As of January 2017, Ukrainian airline Dniproavia serves the following destinations:

Destinations

Bulgaria
Sofia – Sofia International Airport
Israel
Tel Aviv - Ben Gurion International Airport
Romania
Bucharest - Henri Coandă International Airport
Slovenia
Ljubljana – Ljubljana Jože Pučnik Airport (Cancelled)
Ukraine
Dnipro – Dnipro International Airport base
Ivano-Frankivsk – Ivano-Frankivsk Airport
Kyiv – Boryspil International Airport focus city
Lviv – Lviv Danylo Halytskyi International Airport

References

Lists of airline destinations